Blomstrandhamna Bird Sanctuary is a bird reserve at Svalbard, Norway, established in 1973. It includes the skerry in Blomstrandhamna in Haakon VII Land. The protected area covers a total of 580,000 square metres.

References

Bird sanctuaries in Svalbard
Protected areas established in 1973
1973 establishments in Norway